Hum Mart  was a Pakistani online store operated by Hum Network. It became defunct in 2020.

It was founded in 2018 by Malik Faisal Qayyum and Duraid Qureshi. It first started operations as an online retail grocery store across Karachi and now it is also selling additional categories of consumer products like mobile phones, electronics, cosmetics, and toys across Pakistan.

History
Hum Mart was founded in 2018 as a subsidiary of the Hum Network  based in Karachi, Pakistan.

See also
 Airlift Technologies

References

External links 
Official website
New Grocery Shopping site by previous team

Online retailers of Pakistan
2018 establishments in Pakistan
2020 disestablishments in Pakistan